Woolford Provincial Park  is a provincial park in Alberta, Canada, located  east of Cardston, west of Highway 503. It lies to the northeast from Waterton Lakes National Park.

Activities
The following activities are available in the park:

Canoeing and kayaking
Fishing for westslope cutthroat trout, rainbow trout, pike and walleye in the St. Mary River
Front country hiking on trails  maintained in the St. Mary River valley
Wildlife viewing (wolverines, bighorn sheep, bald eagles, white-tailed deer, mule deer, mountain goats, elk, grizzly bear, moose, pika, foxes, beaver, lynx, river otter, bobcat, black bear, timber wolf, bison, coyote, cougar, snowshoe hare and hoary marmot)

See also
List of provincial parks in Alberta
List of Canadian provincial parks
List of National Parks of Canada

References

External links

Provincial parks of Alberta
Cardston County